Gabriël Stephanus "Gaffie" du Toit (born 24 March 1976) is a South African rugby union footballer, who played 14 test matches for the national team, the Springboks, between 1998 and 2004. His usual position is at fly-half, though he has also played at fullback for the Springboks.

Born in Cape Town, du Toit played provincial rugby for the Griquas before making his debut for the Springboks on 13 June 1998 in the 37–13 win over Ireland at the Free State Stadium in Bloemfontein, as fly-half. He landed three conversions and two penalty goals in the match.

He played another five tests for the Springboks the following season, playing in the two wins over Italy as well as the losses to Wales and the All Blacks.

He next played for the Springboks in the mid-year tests of 2004, where he played at fullback in a tests against Ireland. He earned subsequent caps against Wales and Australia, as well as Scotland as the end of the year. He played in South Africa's 2006 mid-year rugby tests.

He spent three years with French powerhouse Toulouse (2006–09), before going back to South Africa where he signed a two-year contract with the Currie Cup First Division side SWD Eagles. He announced the end of his career in April 2010.

References

External links
Gaffie du Toit on genslin.us

1976 births
Living people
Rugby union fly-halves
South African rugby union players
South Africa international rugby union players
Stormers players
Western Province (rugby union) players
Cheetahs (rugby union) players
Free State Cheetahs players
Sharks (Currie Cup) players
Sharks (rugby union) players
Griquas (rugby union) players
Lions (United Rugby Championship) players
Stade Toulousain players
Afrikaner people
Expatriate rugby union players in France
South African expatriate sportspeople in France
South African expatriate rugby union players
South Africa international rugby sevens players
Male rugby sevens players
Rugby sevens players at the 1998 Commonwealth Games
Rugby sevens players at the 2002 Commonwealth Games
Commonwealth Games bronze medallists for South Africa
Commonwealth Games rugby sevens players of South Africa
Commonwealth Games medallists in rugby sevens
Rugby union players from Cape Town
Medallists at the 2002 Commonwealth Games